"4 AM" is a hip hop song by American rapper 2 Chainz, featuring vocals from fellow American rapper and singer Travis Scott. It was released on September 5, 2017, as the second single from the former's fourth studio album, Pretty Girls Like Trap Music (2017). It was sent to urban contemporary radio to be released as a single on September 19, 2017, but originally was released on May 30, as a promotional single. The song was produced by Murda Beatz and Cubeatz.

Composition 
Max Weinstein of XXL wrote that the song had a "mellow vibe" to it, while Winston Cook-Wilson of Spin called it a "detuned, mid-tempo jam." 2 Chainz reminisces throwing himself a surprise birthday party and listening to Lil Wayne's album Tha Carter.

Music video 
The music video was released on November 17, 2017. In it, 2 Chainz and Travis Scott throw a wild party with women, a couple of them topless, around them, with drinking and smoking marijuana involved.

Charts

Certifications

References 

2017 singles
2017 songs
2 Chainz songs
Songs written by 2 Chainz
Travis Scott songs
Songs written by Travis Scott
Songs written by Murda Beatz
Songs written by Kevin Gomringer
Songs written by Tim Gomringer
Def Jam Recordings singles
Song recordings produced by Murda Beatz
Song recordings produced by Cubeatz